Union Township is one of the 14 townships of Mercer County, Ohio, United States.  The 2000 census found 1,490 people in the township, 793 of whom lived in the unincorporated portions of the township.

Geography
Located in the northeastern corner of the county, it borders the following townships:
York Township, Van Wert County - north
Jennings Township, Van Wert County - northeast
Salem Township, Auglaize County - southeast
Center Township - south
Hopewell Township - southwest
Dublin Township - west
Liberty Township, Van Wert County - northwest

The village of Mendon is located in central Union Township.

Name and history
Union Township was organized in 1828. It is one of 27 Union Townships statewide.

Government
The township is governed by a three-member board of trustees, who are elected in November of odd-numbered years to a four-year term beginning on the following January 1. Two are elected in the year after the presidential election and one is elected in the year before it. There is also an elected township fiscal officer, who serves a four-year term beginning on April 1 of the year after the election, which is held in November of the year before the presidential election. Vacancies in the fiscal officership or on the board of trustees are filled by the remaining trustees.

References

External links
County website

Townships in Mercer County, Ohio
Townships in Ohio